Mont-Royal is a station on the Orange Line of the Montreal Metro rapid transit system, operated by the Société de transport de Montréal (STM). It is located in The Plateau neighbourhood of the borough of Le Plateau-Mont-Royal in Montreal, Quebec, Canada. The station opened on October 14, 1966, as part of the original network of the Metro.

Overview 
The station, designed by Victor Prus, is a normal side platform station, built in tunnel. It has a single mezzanine at transept level, giving access to one entrance.

Artwork 
The station has several pieces of artwork. Vertical bands by noted Quebec artist Charles Daudelin consists of 32 narrow vertical aluminum seams at platform level, with extruded square and rectangular forms in high relief. These were some of the first artworks installed in the Metro, present at the opening of the station in 1966. In 2000, the redevelopment of the place Gérald-Godin surrounding the station included the addition of a work of art, a poem by Gérald Godin bricked into the façade of a building, by the art collective Les Industries perdues. In 2022, Je reviens chez nous by artist Simon Bilodeau was installed in the newly rebuilt east entrance. This concrete work represents the limestone strata of the Plateau-Mont-Royal and the various streets & avenues.

Origin of the name
This station is named for Mount Royal Avenue (av. Mont-Royal), so called because it leads to the foot of Mount Royal.

Accessibility 
In October 2018, work began to install two elevators, add two staircases connecting the platforms to the street and build a second walkway above the tracks linking the two platforms. The work also involved construction of a replacement entrance building, with a glass façade and new artwork. A walkway provides access between the two elevators, and the fare booth and ticket machines have been relocated to the street level. 

In July 2022, the station became the 20th accessible station on the Metro. Escalators at the station reopened in fall 2022, completing the project.

Connecting bus routes

Nearby points of interest

Mount Royal Park
Saint Denis Street
Maison de la culture et bibliothèque Mont-Royal
Centre communautaire Projet Changement

References

External links
Mont-Royal Station - official site
Montreal by Metro, metrodemontreal.com - photos, information, and trivia
 2011 STM System Map
 Metro Map

Orange Line (Montreal Metro)
Le Plateau-Mont-Royal
Railway stations in Canada opened in 1966